Nagamadathu Thampuratti is a 1982 Indian Malayalam film, directed by J. Sasikumar and produced by E. K. Thyagarajan. The film stars Prem Nazir, Jayabharathi, Sankaradi and Adoor Bhasi in the lead roles along with Meena, C I Paul, Jagathy Sreekumar, Unni Mary. The film has musical score by M. K. Arjunan. It was dubbed into Hindi as Nag Log.

Cast
Prem Nazir as Jayadevan
Jayabharathi as Nagamadathu Thampuratti (Sathi)
Sankaradi
Meena as Queen
Jagathy Sreekumar as Devadathan
Adoor Bhasi as Thamburan
Unnimary as Chakshugi (Serpent queen)
C I Paul

Soundtrack
The music was composed by M. K. Arjunan and the lyrics were written by Pappanamkodu Lakshmanan, Poovachal Khader and Devadas.

References

External links
 

1982 films
1980s Malayalam-language films
Malayalam remakes of Tamil films
Films directed by J. Sasikumar